Gesina ("Gesche") Margarethe Gottfried (née Timm; 6 March 1785 – 21 April 1831), was a German serial killer who murdered 15 people by arsenic poisoning in Bremen and Hanover, Germany, between 1813 and 1827. She was the last person to be publicly executed in the city of Bremen.

Psychiatric profile 
Gesina Gottfried was born into a poor family in Bremen; she had a twin brother, Johann Timm, Jr.  She was affectionately known as Gesche, the low-German form of Gesina. Her parents, seamstress Gesche Margarethe Timm and tailor Johann Timm, always had a preference for her brother. Her father encouraged her to marry at the first opportunity, and at age 21 she married Johan Mittenberg who made a living as a saddler in Bremen. They had three children together. Things changed when Johan's father died and they inherited some money. Johan's behavior changed and he began drinking and gambling. In 1813 he told Gesche that they were destitute and all the money was spent. A couple of months later, after a short period of stomach pain, he died.

A few months later she met Michael Kristof Gottfried, a relatively-rich wine merchant.

Gesche's mother, Gesche Timm, died following stomach pain, in May 1815. Her own daughters then died, and the scope of victims widened. Coincidentally a cholera epidemic hit Germany around 1815 and helped to obscure her crimes. Moreover, Gesche helped greatly in the town during the epidemic, gaining the nickname the "Angel of Bremen".

In 1826 she sold her house to Johan and Wilhelmina Rumpff and they asked her to stay on as a housekeeper. This led to Wilhemina's death. A maid left saying that illness and death followed Gesche. Johan Rumpff became ill but was now suspicious. He analyzed his food and found specks of white powder, which he took to local chemist Dr. Luce. He decided it was arsenic and notified authorities. Gesche found out and fled to Hanover, where she started killing again, starting with a Mrs. Schmidt and her daughter, who died in May 1827. In July Frederick Klein was killed.

She was captured by authorities on March 6, 1828, her 43rd birthday. News of her arrest quickly spread. She confessed to killing 15 people and to trying to kill many more.

The reasons behind Gottfried's crimes remain unclear and widely debated, but the emotional deprivation she suffered during her childhood and her modus operandi lead to the assumption that she suffered from Munchausen syndrome by proxy, a very common disorder among female serial killers.

Gottfried's victims included her parents, her two husbands, her fiancé, and her children. Before being suspected and convicted of the murders, she garnered widespread sympathy among the inhabitants of Bremen because so many of her family and friends fell ill and died. Because of her devoted nursing of the victims during their time of suffering, she was known as the "Angel of Bremen" until her murders were discovered.

Modus operandi 

She used a rat poison called "mouse butter" (in German "Mäusebutter"), very common at the time, which consisted of small flakes of arsenic mixed in animal fat. She mixed small doses into her victims' food, and when they started to get sick, she "friendly, selfless and resignedly" offered to take care of them during their convalescence, while continuing to poison them.

During the period of her criminal activity, Gesche Gottfried was considered a model citizen and was well-liked in the community. Even after the constant loss of relatives who suffered, it seemed that the friendly, candid and kind Gesche chased a "cloud of misfortune". Her neighbors, moved by her zeal and resignation with caring not only for her family but also her sick friends, called her "the angel of Bremen".

Gesche Gottfried's victims 
 1 October 1813: Johann Miltenberg (first husband)
 2 May 1815: Gesche Margarethe Timm (mother)
 10 May 1815: Johanna Gottfried (daughter)
 18 May 1815: Adelheid Gottfried (daughter)
 28 June 1815: Johann Timm (father)
 22 September 1815: Heinrich Gottfried (son)
 1 June 1816: Johann Timm (brother)
 5 July 1817: Michael Christoph Gottfried (second husband)
 1 June 1823: Paul Thomas Zimmermann (fiancé)
 21 March 1825: Anna Lucia Meyerholz (music teacher and friend)
 5 December 1825: Johann Mosees (neighbor, friend and advisor)
 22 December 1826: Wilhelmine Rumpff (landlady)
 13 May 1827: Elise Schmidt (daughter of Beta Schmidt)
 15 May 1827: Beta Schmidt (friend, maid)
 24 July 1827: Friedrich Kleine (friend, creditor; murdered in Hanover)

Arrest, conviction and execution 

Johann Christoph Rumpff would have been Gesche's twelfth victim if he hadn't become suspicious after finding small white granules on food she had prepared for him. He confided to his physician, Dr. Luce, who had already attended several of the earlier victims, and handed over the substance he had found. Luce determined that it was arsenic and alerted authorities, but by then Gottfried had already claimed two more victims and had moved to Hannover, where she was withering the life of her latest victim, Friedrich Kleine.

On the night of March 6, 1828, her 43rd birthday, she was arrested. Sentenced to death by decapitation, she was publicly executed on 21 April 1831. It was the last public execution in the history of Bremen. Gottfried's death mask was made to study the facial patterns of criminal women. This is within the now-obsolete field of study of phrenology.

Influences on literature 
Gottfried's crimes were the inspiration for several works of art and literature. One such work, a 2016 art book by Sarah Bodeman called GIFT: I Made This For You, ("Gift" is German for "poison") is set up like a pamphlet with fourteen recipes for each of Gottfried's victims. All of the food was cooked and photographed with the same ingredients and the same sequence of the original food that was made for Gottfried's victims. Another work titled "Gift" is a 2013 graphic novel by Peer Meter, with drawings by Barbara Yelin. It depicts Gottfried's story and her manner of poisoning her victims. Finally, in Murderesses in German Writing, 1720-1860: Heroines of Horror (2009), Susanne Kord discusses Gottfried and other woman murders, as well as how literature has portrayed these women.

Bremer Freiheit (1971) was a play by Rainer Werner Fassbinder, based on Geesche Gottfried's crimes. In 1972 Fassbinder shot a television version of his play starring Margit Carstensen.

Gesche-Gottfried-Weg 
In the Bremen district of Gröpelingen, a street was given the name Gesche-Gottfried-Weg.

See also
 List of German serial killers

References

External links

 
 Gesche Gottfried 
 Detention House 
 Gesche Gottfried in Stade 
 Gesche Gottfried's death mask 
 Article about the execution 
  Willibald Alexis / Julius Eduard Hitzig: Kriminalfälle des neuen Pitaval - Gesche Margaretha Gottfried 
Effigy – Poison and the City (2019): historical thriller about the Gesche Gottfried case

1785 births
1813 murders in Europe 
1815 murders in Europe 
1817 murders in Europe 
1823 murders in Europe
1825 murders in Europe
1826 murders in Europe 
1827 murders in Europe
1831 deaths
1810s murders in Europe 
1820s murders in Europe
19th-century executions by Germany
19th-century German criminals
19th-century murders in Germany
Criminals from Bremen (state)
Executed German female serial killers
Executed people from Bremen (state)
Filicides in Germany
Fratricides
German twins
Mariticides
Matricides
Patricides
People executed by Germany by decapitation
People from Bremen
Poisoners